Cârlomăneşti may refer to several places in Romania:

 Cârlomăneşti, a village in Vernești Commune, Buzău County
 Cârlomăneşti, a village in Cerțești Commune, Galați County

See also 
 Cârlomanu, a village in Teleorman County
 Cârlig (disambiguation)